is a Japanese contemporary feminist photographer and performance artist. She has been included in numerous group shows in Japan, Europe and the US. Her first solo exhibition was in 1997 at Japan's Gallery Chat. In 2004 she was awarded the prestigious Kimura Ihei Memorial Photography Award for Young Japanese Photographer as well as the International Center of Photography Infinity Award in the category of Young Photographer.

Life and work
Sawada graduated in 1998 with a degree in Media Design, then later in 2000 with a degree in Photography from the Seian University of Art and Design in Otsu, Shiga, Japan. Some of her works of art include ID-400, OMIAI♡, Costume, Schoolgirls, Costume, Cover, Masquerade, Recruit, Mirrors, and Facial Signature. Her work investigates human identity and especially gender roles and stereotypes in Japanese culture.

Sawada uses photography and techniques of performance art to explore ideas of identity, status, culture, individualism, and conformity through traditional and contemporary cultural methods of portraiture. Sawada's photographs are each part of a themed photo series in which she makes use of make-up and costume to dramatically alter her identity, such that each photograph appears to represent a different individual or group of individuals, when all subjects are Sawada herself. Sawada uses commercial photographers, photo booths, and her own studio environment with digital photo editing to represent hundreds of different identities. Tomoko's use of costume in her self-portraits draws inspiration from the work of Cindy Sherman. Her work also explores the way assumptions about personality are largely driven by Japanese cultural responses to gender, job occupation, and other socio-cultural stereotypes.

Career
Sawada's earliest self-portrait photo series is Early Days from 1995 to 1996 made while Sawada was in her teens. Her next series, ID400, was created over the course of 4 years, from 1998 to 2001 using a public photo booth to take 400 different ID card style self-portraits while Sawada altered her appearance through costume, hair, and make-up changes along with altering her facial expression or even gaining/losing weight. Subsequent photo series continue to explore varying methods of altering Sawada's outward appearance then documenting these changes using single and group style photographic methods.

Early Days, 1995–1996
Sawada's earliest photo series.

ID400, 1998–2001
For this photo series, Sawada visited the same photo booth outside a train station in Kobe, Japan over the course of four years to create 400 different black and white ID card photos of herself.

OMIAI♡, 2001
Sawada's OMIAI♡ series references the traditional photo book of a young woman used by her family members for an arranged marriage. Sawada was photographed in a professional photography studio. On each visit she dressed as a different type of woman, as the photographs are carefully produced with the intention of showing a woman's identity for the prospective young man and his family.

Cover/Face, 2002–2003
Photographs in this series show Sawada attired based on trends of the Japanese youth culture and the influence of Western ideas of beauty. She dressed herself as a ganguro, described as a tan, California girl type idolizing the pop music star Namie Amuro.

Costume, 2003
Sawada dresses in the uniforms and work clothes associated with various jobs. The idea for this series grew from her personal experiences working in different roles and learning how different people responded to her in these roles, "people's attitude toward another person changes greatly according to their occupation."

School Days, 2004
This series shows Sawada repeated within the same large group class portraits as both the students and their teacher wearing a school girl uniform and then dressed as the typical school matron. Sawada finds ways of altering her presentation wearing identical school uniforms through changes to her hair style, accessories, and facial expressions, then the images are digitally combined to create the class, including a background.

Exhibitions and awards

Solo exhibitions
1997, Gallery Chat, Noir, Japan
1999, ID400, Clean Sisters Gallery, Osaka
1999, ID400, Cubic Gallery Iteza, Kyoto
2000, ID400, Rocket, Tokyo
2001, Omiai, Rocket, Tokyo
2001, Omiai, Sou Art Gallery, Ehime
2001, Omiai, The Third Gallery Aya, Osaka
2001, Cover, VAJRA, Osaka
2001, Connoisseur Contemporary, Hong Kong
2002, Cover, SUMISO, Osaka
2002, Omiai, Galerie P, Brussels
2003, ID400 and Omiai, Kohji Ogura Gallery, Nagoya
2003, Two Photographic Series, Zabriskie Gallery, New York
2003, Costume, The Third Gallery Aya, Osaka
2004, Costume + cover, Konica Minolta Plaza, Tokyo
2004, ID400, The Third Gallery Aya, Osaka
2004, Costume, Zabriskie Gallery, New York
2004, Desire to Mimic, MAK, Vienna
2005, Schoolgirls – School Days + cover/Face, MEM, Osaka
2006, Schoolgirls, Zabriskie Gallery, New York 
2011, Rose Gallery, Santa Monica, CA

Group shows
Santa Barbara Museum of Art, California
Japan Society, New York
Det Nationale Fotomuseum, Copenhagen
Culturgest, Lisbon
Z Platz Museum, Fukuoka, Japan
Musee de l’Elysee, Lausanne
Japanisches Kulturinstitut, Cologne
Museum of Contemporary Art, Tokyo
Museum of Contemporary Photography, Chicago
Ueno Royal Museum, Tokyo; Kawasaki City Museum
Museum of Modern Art, New York.

Awards
2000 Canon New Cosmos of Photography 2000
2004 The Kimura Ihei Memorial Photography Award 
2004 International Center of Photography (New York) Infinity Award for Young Photographers
2007 They Kyoto Prefecture Culture Prize

Permanent collections
Museum of Modern Art, New York
International Center of Photography, New York
Los Angeles County Museum of Art
Fogg Museum of Art, Harvard University, Cambridge
Joy of Giving Something, Inc., New York
Norton Family Collection
MAK, Vienna, Austria
The Essl Collection, Klosternerberg, Austria
La Salle Bank, Illinois
Santa Barbara Museum of Art, California
National Museum of Modern Art, Kyoto, Japan
Maison Europeenne de la Photographie, Paris, France
Sculpture Garden Museum, Vangi Museo, Japan
Davis Museum and Cultural Centre, USA
Brooklyn Museum of Art, New York City

References

External links
Official Website
 Tomoko Sawada at Rose, Los Angeles Times 21 July 2011. Retrieved 28 April 2014
Tomoko Sawada on Feminist Artbase, Brooklyn Museum. Retrieved 28 April 2014

Japanese photographers
Japanese women photographers
1977 births
Living people